Beto Carrero World theme park is located in Penha, Brazil. The park is part of Santa Catarina's signature amusement parks. It is the largest theme park in Latin America occupying  divided into 7 different theme areas.

History 
Beto Carrero World was developed by Brazilian businessman and entertainer Beto Carrero. It opened on December 28, 1991, in Santa Catarina. In 2012, Beto Carrero World announced a joint partnership with DreamWorks Animation and Universal Pictures which allowed the park to feature characters from both film studios.

In 2012, the park bought the former Batman & Robin: The Chiller roller coaster from Six Flags Great Adventure. The ride was expected to open in 2014, but the ride was never assembled for unknown reasons and was scrapped in 2018.

The park also sold their Freefall after the 2018 season. It is planned to be rebuilt at a park west of São Paulo.

Location 
Beto Carrero World is in the city of Penha on the north coast of Santa Catarina.

Shows 
 Velozes e Furiosos Show (Fast and Furious Show)
 Portal da Escuridão (Portal of Darkness)
 Monga
 O Sonho do Cowboy (The Cowboy's Dream)
 Madagascar Circus Show
 Blum
 Excalibur

Theme areas 
The park is divided into seven distinct themed areas.

Avenida das Nações (Nations' Avenue) 
Avenida das Nações is the entrance to Beto Carrero World.

Attractions

 Castelo das Nações (Nations' Castle): Occupies 10,444m2 of area and contains the ticket office, the new railroad to Aventura Selvagem (Wild Adventure), shops, cafés, bathrooms, lockers, and other services.
 Carrossel (Carousel) 
 Baby Elefante (Baby Elephant) 
 Pedalinho (Paddle boat): a ride on the lake next to the Pirate Island
 As aventuras de Betinho Carrero-4D (The Adventures of Betinho Carrero-4D): A 4D cinema
 Palacio Dos Sorvetes (Ice-cream Palace) 
 Praça De Alimentação (Food court) 
 Praça De Eventos (Event Hall)
 Roda-Gigante (Ferris Wheel): a Ferris wheel about 25 meters in height 
 Teleférico (Cable car) 
 Acqua: Water show
 Raskapuska: boat ride in a mountain interior, filled with scenes featuring hundreds of characters from children's literature. It's similar to It's a Small World.
 Super Carros (Super Cars): Attraction where guests can ride or drive luxury sports cars.
 Passeio De Helicóptero (Ride in the Helicopter): Aerial tour with views of the city of Penha and the park.

Mundo Animal (Animal World) 
Mundo Animal is a themed area that features a zoo housing different animals.

Attractions

 Zoológico (Zoo): Houses animals such as tigers, jaguars, bears, lions, giraffes, and elephants.
 Ilha dos Macacos (Monkeys' Island): A little archipelago in one of the lakes of the park where animals are observed in the open.
 Mamães e Filhotes (Moms and Babies): Area where different infant animals are kept.
 Snake show: A 10-minute show featuring snakes.
 Passarela dos Tigres (Catwalk Tigers): A series of cages with a catwalk between them where visitors can observe tigers, lions, and jaguars.
 Palácio das Serpentes (Serpents' Palace): A building that houses serpents.
 Monga: A 10-minute illusion show.
 Dum-Dum: A roller-coaster inspired by the Dum Dum alligator, one of the characters of Betinho Carrero's Gang.
 Centro de Primatologia Beto Carrero (Beto Carrero's Center of Primatology): A primate study center that opened in 2007.
 Mundo Mágico das Aves (Magical World of Birds): Aviary where the visitors can meet different species of birds.

Vila Germânica (Germanic village) 
Vila Germânica is a themed area dedicated to German migrants in Santa Catarina.

Attractions
 Bier Haus: German-themed restaurant.
 Auto Pista: Traditional bumper cars.
 Mundo Maravilhoso dos Cavalos (The Wonderful World of Horses): Space dedicated to horses.
 Xícaras Malucas (Crazy Teacups): A teacups ride.
 Excalibur: A 45-minute show featuring costumed actors and dueling in search of the eponymous sword.
 Cine Renato Aragão: Area dedicated to hosting conventions, lectures, and other events.
 Tigor Mountain: of Dutch fabrication, this family roller-coaster is approximately 600 meters long and features a German-style station.
 Kidplay: A child-exclusive maze in the midst of tubes and ball pit.
 Acqua Boat: Bumper car ride on the water.

Velho Oeste (Old West) 
A small village with typical Old West structures, including a small church and saloons.

Attractions
 Aldeia Indígena (Indian Village): Facsimile of a North American Indian village.
 Fort Álamo: Food court/shopping complex.
 Trenzinho (Little train): Attraction where children can ride a train.
 Cavalarias: Visitors can ride horses through an obstacle course.
 O Sonho do Cowboy (Cowboy's Dream): A show that recounts the life of Beto Carrero as the Brazilian cowboy. The production incorporates scenes and artifacts from the Old West.
 Hípica: Building where the horses are treated.
 Memorial Beto Carrero: Memorial that depicts the Carrero's history. It features Carrero's whip, hats, photos and videos of Beto Carrero with personal friends, and a John Wayne trailer for Carrero's personal use.

Ilha dos Piratas (Pirates' Island) 
A pirate-themed island connected to the center of the park by a hanging bridge.

Attractions
 Bar Pirata: A pirate-themed bar.
 Casa dos Espelhos (House of Mirrors): House with distorting mirrors.
 Caverna dos Piratas (Pirates' Cave): Pirate-themed cave.
 Galeão Pirata (Pirate Galleon): Scenic spot with a waterfall.
 Barco Pirata (Pirate Boat): A traditional pirate boat.

Aventura Radical (Extreme Adventure) 

Aventura Radical houses amusement rides. It is the most visited area of the park.

 Civilizações Perdidas (Lost Civilizations): Themed area with ruins of ancient civilizations. It housed the Empire of the Waters which opened in 2004. It had been renovated to make room for Madagascar.
 Tchibum: Water ride where boats plummet into a water tank.
 Star Mountain: Netherlands-imported ride originally named Star World Mountain. It is 35 m high and reaches a maximum speed of almost 90 km/h.
 Big Tower: Free fall tower that opened in 2003. It is the tallest attraction in the park at 93 meters high and reaches a speed of 120 km/h.
 Portal da Escuridão (Darkness Portal): Horror-themed attraction. Visitors pass through seven scenes inspired by famous horror films such as The Exorcist and The Texas Chainsaw Massacre. 
 FireWhip (Chicote de Fogo): Roller coaster which opened in late 2008. It is 40 meters high, 700 meters long, and reaches a speed of almost 100 km/h.
 Velozes e Furiosos Show (Fast and Furious Show): Inspired by the eponymous franchise, the car show changed after the partnership with DreamWorks and Universal Pictures.
 Pista de Kart (Kart Track): Racing attraction that allows visitors to drive in cars like a Formula One.
 Quadriciclo (Quadricycle): ATV ride that travels through the park.
 Acqua Bolha (Water Bubble): Water attraction where visitors get in bubbles to let them walk on water.

Madagascar 
During the 17th edition of AVIRRP Association of Ribeirão Preto Travel Agencies (SP), the construction of a new themed area was announced. The Madagascar was supposed to open in October 2013, but work on it was completed in February 2014.

Attractions 
 Madagascar Crazy River Adventure!: Raft ride that takes visitors through a river almost one kilometer long and five meters wide.
 Madagascar Circus Show: Circus show where Madagascar characters dance and perform stunts.
 Foto com personagens (Pictures with Characters): An area to take pictures with the Madagascar characters.

Terra da Fantasia (Fantasy Land) 
One of the areas of the park where all the attractions are seen on a train tour. The tour is narrated by the driver of the train. The main points of the tour are:

 Casa do Beto Carrero (Beto Carrero's House): In front of a mansion, several cowboys simulate an assault on the train. But within minutes the sheriff of the region appears to save the passengers. Before 2008, the person saving the train was Beto Carrero.
 Caverna dos Dinossauros (Dinosaurs' Cave): Jurassic era-themed cave with animatronic dinosaurs. The cave has a film scene with computer-controlled lights and sounds.
 Horta Modelo (Garden Model): Large sculptures of fruits and vegetables.
 Terra dos Gigantes (Giants' Land): Several scenes containing statues of turtles, crocodiles, and other large animals.
 Vale Encantado (Enchanted Valley)
 Vila Esperança (Hope Village): a tribute to Azorean community representing a small village. Some buildings in the scene were real houses before the park's construction.
 Vila Árabe (Arab Village): A palace and its sultan that honors the Arab community.
 Mundo Mágico Das Aves (Magical World of Birds): New attraction of Beto Carrero World. Visitors enter a nursery home for several species of birds. Along the way, visitors pass by a detailed landscape includes bridges, waterfalls, rivers and trees.

Former attractions 

 África Misteriosa: Inside a huge theater located in the middle of the jungle, the show included acrobatics, dances and animals. It was located in the Animal World and lasted for 45 minutes.
 Trem Fantasma: Typical attraction of theme parks. It was in the Extreme Adventure area and had three floors.
 Tapete Mágico: It was located in the Extreme Adventure area.
 Traum Boat: It was located in German Village. Similar to the famous Kamikaze.
 Animal Actors: Show with trained animals. It was located in the Theatre Mauricio Sirotsky Sobrinho, which has undergone renovations and integrated into the area of Madagascar.
 Piráguas: A carousel of boats on the water. It was in the Animal World area.
 Segura Peão: Small child's attraction with a small mechanical horse that used to be in the Wild West area.
 Império da Águas: Re-themed to the new attraction "Madagascar Crazy River Adventure!".
 Elevador: A Freefall tower sold after the 2018 season.

Events 
Beto Carrero World has put on various events, such as Thriller Nights, a tribute to the king of pop Michael Jackson, and the Island of Darkness, a spooky-themed Island Of Pirates.
  'Thriller Nights'  (2009)
  'Island of Darkness'  (2010-2011)
 '' 'Dream Valley' '(2012-2013)

Automotive complex 
The amusement park holds a motocross track and an international kart track designed by Herman Tilke. In 2011, it hosted 500 Miles Kart, an event that brings together leading Motorsport and Brazilian celebrities.

Controversies 

In November 2011, during a performance car called "Extreme Show", a motorcyclist hit a car; both the motorcyclist and the car's driver were unharmed.

In February 2013, student Fernanda Dryer, 23, had her scalp ripped off while riding a go-kart at the Beto Carrero World theme park after her hair was caught in the engine of the kart.

See also 

 Mirabilandia
 Hopi Hari
 Play center (park)

References

External links
Official site

Animal theme parks
Amusement parks in Brazil
Buildings and structures in Santa Catarina (state)
Tourist attractions in Santa Catarina (state)
Amusement parks opened in 1991
1991 establishments in Brazil
Zoos in Brazil